Glenea paramephisto is a species of beetle in the family Cerambycidae. It was described by Stephan von Breuning in 1972.

References

paramephisto
Beetles described in 1972